The World Monuments Watch is a flagship advocacy program of the New York-based private non-profit organization, World Monuments Fund (WMF) that  is dedicated to preserving and safeguarding the historic, artistic, and architectural heritage of humankind.

Selection process
Every two years, it publishes a select list known as the Watch List of 100 Most Endangered Sites that is in urgent need of preservation funding and protection. It is a call to action on behalf of threatened cultural heritage monuments worldwide. The sites are nominated by governments, conservation professionals, site caretakers, non-government organizations (NGOs), concerned individuals, and others working in the field. An independent panel of international experts then select 100 candidates from these entries to be part of the Watch List, based on the significance of the sites, the urgency of the threat, and the viability of both advocacy and conservation solutions. A site’s inclusion on the Watch List brings them to international attention, helping to raise funds needed for its rescue and spurring local governments and communities to take an active role in protecting the cultural landmark.

2002 Watch List
The 2002 World Monuments Watch List of 100 Most Endangered Sites was launched on October 11, 2001 by WMF President Bonnie Burnham at a press conference at the Museum of Modern Art in New York. The Watch List was expanded to 101 in the wake of the devastating destruction of the World Trade Center on September 11, 2001. Its vicinity—the Lower Manhattan area, was added as an imperiled urban site.

List by country/territory

Statistics by country/territory
The following countries/territories have multiple sites entered on the 2002 Watch List, listed by the number of sites:

Notes

A. Numbers list meant only as a guide on this article. No official reference numbers have been designated for the sites on the Watch List.
B. Names and spellings used for the sites were based on the official 2002 Watch List as published.
C. The references to the sites' locations and periods of construction were based on the official 2002 Watch List as published.
D. The WMF has added the Historic Lower Manhattan area to the 2002 Watch List as its 101st site, in the aftermath of the September 11 terrorist attacks.
E. Tally includes the Historic Lower Manhattan site.

References

External links
World Monuments Fund home page
World Monuments Watch home page

Historic preservation
2002 works